Carl Taylor may refer to:

Carl E. Taylor (1916–2010), physician
Carl Taylor (baseball) (born 1944), American Major League Baseball player
Carl Taylor (footballer) (born 1937), English footballer
Carl C. Taylor, softball coach at Rutgers University

See also
Karl Taylor (disambiguation)